Acanthodaphne is a genus of sea snails, marine gastropod mollusks in the family Raphitomidae.

Species
Species within the genus Acanthodaphne include:
 Acanthodaphne abbreviata (Schepman, 1913)
 Acanthodaphne basicincta Morassi & Bonfitto, 2010
 Acanthodaphne boucheti Morassi & Bonfitto, 2010
 Acanthodaphne pungens Morassi & Bonfitto, 2010
 † Acanthodaphne pusula (Laws, 1947) 
 Acanthodaphne sabellii Bonfitto & Morassi, 2006

References

 Morassi & Bonfitto, New raphitomine gastropods (Gastropoda: Conidae: Raphitominae) from the South-West Pacific

External links
  Bouchet, P.; Kantor, Y. I.; Sysoev, A.; Puillandre, N. (2011). A new operational classification of the Conoidea (Gastropoda). Journal of Molluscan Studies. 77(3): 273-308

 
Raphitomidae
Gastropod genera